Sandy LaBeaux (born August 22, 1961) is a former American football defensive back. He played for the Tampa Bay Buccaneers in 1983 and for the Houston Gamblers in 1985.

References

1961 births
Living people
American football defensive backs
Cal State Hayward Pioneers football players
Tampa Bay Buccaneers players
Houston Gamblers players